Dysidazirine is a organic compound with formula C19H33NO2. It was discovered as a natural product in 1988 in the marine sponge Dysidea fragilis. Chemically, it is a 2H-azirine derivative.

Dysidazirine synthesis was reported for the first time in 1995.

Dysidazirine kills the yeasts Candida albicans and Sacharamyces cerevisiae in vitro. It also stops HCT-116 human colon cancer cells from growing.

References 

Nitrogen heterocycles
Fatty acid esters
Methyl esters